Gerold of Vinzgau (also Vintzgouw or Anglachgau; 725 - 799) was a count in Kraichgau and Anglachgau. His daughter, Hildegard, married King Charlemagne in 771.

Life
Little is known about Gerold. However, he seems to be related to the Agilolfing family, the first ruling dynasty in Bavaria. But his exact ancestry is not certain. In 784, he and his wife made important donations to the newly founded abbey of Lorsch. These were estates in the vicinity of Worms and Heidelberg. 

As Margrave of Avaria, Gerold, his son, Eric of Friuli, and Pepin of Italy campaigned against the Avars. Gerold died on the eve of battle in 799.

Marriage and issue
He was married before 754 to Emma (d. 789 or 798 or after 784), daughter of Hnabi, Duke of Alamannia. They had the following:
Eric of Friuli
Gerold
Udalrich
Hildegard, born in 754, married King Charlemagne in 771.
 Adrian, Count of Orléans, father of Odo I, Count of Orléans
 Peter, Abbot of Reichenau

References

Sources

External links
 , Charles Cawley's "Medieval Lands", hosted at the Foundation for Medieval Genealogy
 Gerold,  genealogie-mittelalter.de

725 births
799 deaths
8th-century dukes of Bavaria
Udalriching dynasty
8th-century rulers in Europe
Burials at the Imperial Abbey of Reichenau